This is a list of noteworthy comic book conventions, as distinct from anime conventions, furry conventions, gaming conventions, horror conventions, multigenre conventions, and science fiction conventions.

Africa

Algeria
Algiers International Comics Festival in Algiers, Algeria (est. 2008)

Egypt
EgyCon in Cairo, Egypt (est. 2013)
Cairo Comix Con in Cairo, Egypt (est. 2015)

Americas

Argentina
Fantabaires in Buenos Aires (est. 1996)

Brazil
Bienal de Quadrinhos de Curitiba in Curitiba, PR (est. 2011)
Comic Con Experience (CCXP) in São Paulo, SP (est. 2014)
Festival Internacional de Quadrinhos (FIQ) in Belo Horizonte, MG (est. 1999)
PerifaCon (Favela Comic Con) in São Paulo, SP (est. 2019)

Canada
Calgary Comic and Entertainment Expo in Calgary, Alberta (est. 2005)
Central Canada Comic Con (C4) in Winnipeg, Manitoba (est. 2006)

Fan Expo Canada in Toronto, Ontario (est. 1995)
Hal-Con in Halifax, Nova Scotia (est. 2010)
Montreal Comiccon in Montreal, Quebec (est. 2006)
Ottawa Comiccon in Ottawa, Ontario (est. 2012)
Toronto Comic Arts Festival in Toronto, Ontario (TCAF) (est. 2003)
Toronto Comicon in Toronto, Ontario (est. 2001)
Vancouver Halloween Parade & Expo in Vancouver, British Columbia (est. 2014)

United States
Alamo City Comic Con in San Antonio, Texas (est. 2013)
Alternative Press Expo in San Jose, California (est. 1994)
Baltimore Comic-Con in Baltimore, Maryland (est. 2000)
Big Apple Comic Con in New York City, New York (est. 1996)
Chicago Comic & Entertainment Expo in Chicago, Illinois (est. 2010)
Comicpalooza in Houston, Texas (est. 2008)
Dallas Comic Con in Dallas, Texas (est. 2002)
Denver Pop Culture Con in Denver, Colorado (formerly Denver Comic Con) (est. 2012)
Dragon Con in Atlanta, Georgia (est. 1987)
East Coast Black Age of Comics Convention in Philadelphia, Pennsylvania (est. 2002)
East Coast Comicon in Secaucus, New Jersey (est. 2012 as "Asbury Park Comicon")
Emerald City Comic Con in Seattle, Washington (est. 2003)
Fan Expo Boston in Boston, Massachusetts (formerly Boston Comic Con) (est. 2007)
FanX in Salt Lake City, Utah (formerly Salt Lake Comic Con) (est. 2013)
Heroes Convention in Charlotte, North Carolina (est. 1982)
Indy PopCon in Indianapolis, Indiana (est. 2014)
Intervention in the Washington, D.C. area (est. 2010)
L.A. Comic Con in Los Angeles, California (est. 2011)
MegaCon in Orlando, FL (est. 1993)
Memphis Comic and Fantasy Convention in Memphis, Tennessee (est. 2010)
MoCCA Festival in New York City, New York (est. 2002)
Motor City Comic Con in Novi, Michigan (est. 1989)
New York Comic Con in New York City, New York (est. 2006)
North Texas Comic Book Show in Dallas, Texas (est. 2011, quarterly events)
Ohio Comic Con in Columbus, Ohio (est. 1980 as "Mid-Ohio Con")
Pensacola Comic Convention, Pensacola, Florida (est. 2010 as "Pensacola Para Con Comic Convention")
Phoenix Fan Fusion in Phoenix, Arizona (est. 2002 as "Phoenix Cactus Comicon")
Pittsburgh Comicon in Monroeville, Pennsylvania (est. 1994)
Planet Comicon Kansas City in Kansas City, Missouri (est. 1999)
Rhode Island Comic Con in Providence, Rhode Island (est. 2012)
Rose City Comic Con in Portland, Oregon (est. 2012)
San Diego Comic-Con in San Diego, California (est. 1970 as the "Golden State Comic Book Convention")
Silicon Valley Comic Con in San Jose, California (est. 2016)
Small Press Expo in Bethesda, Maryland (est. 1994)
Small Press and Alternative Comics Expo (SPACE) in Columbus, Ohio (est. 2000)
STAPLE! in Austin, Texas (est. 2005)
Wizard World Chicago in suburban Chicago, Illinois (est. 1972 as "Nostalgia '72;" later known as the "Chicago Comicon")
WonderCon in Anaheim, California (est. 1987 in Bay Area as "Wonderful World of Comics Convention")

Asia

Bahrain
IGN Convention in Manama, Bahrain (est. 2013)

Bangladesh
Dhaka Pop Culture Expo in Dhaka, Bangladesh (est. 2013)

Hong Kong
Animation-Comic-Game Hong Kong in Wan Chai, Hong Kong (est. 2004)

India
Comic Con India in Delhi, Mumbai, Bangalore, and Hyderabad, India (est. 2011)
Comics Fest India in New Delhi, India (est. 2008)

Indonesia
Indonesia Comic Con in Jakarta, Indonesia (est. 2015)

Japan
Comiket in Tokyo, Japan (est. 1975)

Malaysia
Comic Fiesta in Kuala Lumpur, Malaysia (est. 2002)

Philippines
Asia Pop Comic Convention in Metro Manila, Philippines (est. 2015)
Komikon in Metro Manila, Philippines (est. 2005)

Saudi Arabia
Saudi Comic Con in Jeddah, Saudi Arabia (est. 2017)

South Korea
Comic World in Seoul and Busan, South Korea (est. 1999)

United Arab Emirates
IGN Convention in Dubai, United Arab Emirates (est. 2013)
Middle East Film and Comic Con in Dubai, United Arab Emirates (est. 2012)

Europe

Belgium
F.A.C.T.S. in Ghent, Belgium (est. 1993)

Finland
Helsinki Comics Festival in Helsinki, Finland (est. 1979)

France
Angoulême International Comics Festival in Angoulême, France (est. 1974)
Comic Con Paris in Paris, France (est. 2007)
Générations Star Wars et Science Fiction in Cusset, France (est. 1999)
Lille Comics Festival in Lille, France (est. 2006)

Germany
German Comic Con in Dortmund, Berlin, Munich, and Frankfurt (est. 2015)

Greece
AthensCon in Athens, Greece (est. 2015)

Italy
International Cartoonists Exhibition in Rapallo (est. 1972)
Komikazen in Ravenna (est. 2005)
Lucca Comics & Games in Lucca (est. 1965 in Bordighera as "Salone Internazionale del Comics")
Mantua Comics & Games in Mantua (est. 2006)
Romics in Rome (est. 2001)

Poland
International Festival of Comics and Games in Łódź, Poland (est. 1991)
Pyrkon in Poznań, Poland (est. 1999) 
Warsaw Comic Con in Warsaw, Poland (est. 2017)

Portugal
Amadora BD in Amadora, Portugal (est. 1989)

Romania
East European Comic Con in Bucharest, Romania (est. 2013)

Russia
Comic-Con Russia, annual fan convention held in Moscow, Russia (est. 2014)
Starcon, annual convention held in Saint Petersburg, Russia (est. 1999)

Serbia
International Comics Festival "Salon stripa" in Belgrade, Serbia (est. 2003)

Slovakia
Comics Salon, Bratislava, Slovakia (est. 2004)

Spain
Barcelona International Comic Fair, Barcelona, Spain (est. 1981)

Sweden
UppCon, Uppsala, Sweden (est. 2002)

United Kingdom
CAPTION in Oxford, England (est. 1992)
Edinburgh Comic Con in Edinburgh, Scotland (est. 2014)
London Film and Comic Con in London, England (est. 2004)
 Thought Bubble Festival in Yorkshire, England (est. 2007)
London Super Comic Convention in London, England (est. 2012)
MCM London Comic Con in London, England (est. 2002)
Comic Con Liverpool in Liverpool, England (est. 2018)
Comic Con Scotland in Edinburgh, Scotland (est. 2018)
Wales Comic Con in Wrexham, Wales and Telford, England (est. 2008)

Ukraine
Comic Con Ukraine in Kyiv, Ukraine (est. 2018)

Oceania

Australia
Australian Movie & Comic Expo (formerly Armageddon), in Melbourne (est. 1995)
Supanova Pop Culture Expo in various cities (est. 2002)
Oz Comic Con in various cities (est. 2012)

New Zealand
Armageddon (est. 1995). in Auckland, Wellington, Christchurch, and Dunedin.

See also 
 List of defunct comic book conventions

Notes

References

 
Entertainment lists